Isaac Van Arsdale Brown (November 4, 1784 – April 19, 1861) was an American educator and Presbyterian clergyman who founded the Lawrenceville School near Princeton, New Jersey.

Biography
He was born in Somerset County, New Jersey, November 4, 1784 and graduated from Princeton University in 1802. He studied theology under Dr. John Woodhull, of Freehold Township, New Jersey. Later, he was ordained by the New Brunswick presbytery, and in 1807 was made pastor at Lawrenceville, New Jersey, where in 1810 he established a classical and commercial boarding-school. In 1842 he moved to Mount Holly, New Jersey, and subsequently to Trenton, New Jersey, where he devoted his time principally to literary work. Among his publications are "Life of Robert Finley, D. D.," "The Unity of the Human Race." and also a "Historical Vindication of the Abrogation of the Plan of Union by the Presbyterian Church in the United States of America" (Philadelphia, 1855). Dr. Brown was one of the founders of the American Colonization Society, and worked for its advancement, and was one of the original members of the American Bible Society. He died on April 19, 1861, in Trenton, NJ.

References
 Mulford, Ronald J (1935). History of the Lawrenceville School 1810–1935. Princeton University Press

1784 births
1861 deaths
American Presbyterians
Founders of schools in the United States
People from Mount Holly, New Jersey
People from Somerset County, New Jersey
People from Trenton, New Jersey
Educators from New Jersey
19th-century American educators
19th-century American philanthropists